50+1 rule  is an informal term used to refer to a clause in the regulations of the Deutsche Fußball-Liga (German Football League). The clause states that, in order to obtain a license to compete in the Bundesliga, a club must either wholly- or majority-own its association football team. In case of majority ownership, the football team is operated as a separate company, of which 50% of the votes plus one vote must belong to the parent club, while the rest of votes belong to the investors. The rule is designed to ensure that the club's members retain overall control,way of owning 50% of shares, +1 share, protecting clubs from the influence of external investors.

Background
Prior to 1998, football clubs in Germany were owned exclusively by members' associations. This meant that clubs were run as not-for-profit organisations, and private ownership was not allowed under any circumstances. This changed following a ruling by the German Football Association (DFB) in October 1998, which allowed clubs to convert their football teams into public or private limited companies. However, the "50+1 rule" requires the parent club to own at least 50% plus one additional share of the football company, ensuring that the club's members still hold a majority of voting rights.

Exceptions
In cases where a person or company has substantially funded a club for a continuous period of 20 years, it is possible for that person or company to own a controlling stake in the club. This exception most notably applies to Bayer 04 Leverkusen (owned by pharmaceuticals company Bayer), and VfL Wolfsburg (owned by automobile manufacturer Volkswagen), because they have been owned by their parent companies since their inception predating the Bundesliga, and has more recently allowed SAP co-founder Dietmar Hopp to gain control of his former youth club of 1899 Hoffenheim.

Criticism
The rule has been criticised on a number of occasions. One of the rule's most vocal opponents is Hannover 96 president Martin Kind, who argued that the rule could be in breach of EU competition law. In 2009, Hannover put forward a motion to change the 50+1 rule, but this was overwhelmingly rejected, with 32 out of 36 clubs voting against the proposal.

The effectiveness of the rule has also been brought into question following the rise of RB Leipzig. Although it is theoretically possible to become a voting member in the association, RB Leipzig reserves the right to reject any membership application without citing a reason. As a result, RB Leipzig has only a handful of members, most of whom are Red Bull GmbH agents. Critics have also noted that the annual membership fee is relatively expensive compared to other clubs.

Other countries
In Sweden, the "51-per cent rule" says that only non-profit clubs can play in the Swedish league systems, and if the club owns a company handling economic activities, the club must own at least 51% of that company. This rule is decided by the Swedish Sports Confederation and is valid for all sports.

References

External links
 Statuten DFL - bundesliga.de - die offizielle Webseite der Bundesliga 

Football in Germany
Sports rules and regulations